is a former Japanese football player. He played for Japan national team.

Club career
Kobayashi was born in Kanagawa Prefecture on 7 July 1930. After graduating from Keio University, he played Keio BRB was consisted of his alma mater Keio University players and graduates. He won 1954 and 1956 Emperor's Cup at the club.

National team career
In June 1956, Kobayashi was selected Japan national team for 1956 Summer Olympics qualification. At this qualification, on June 3, he debuted against South Korea. In November, he played at 1956 Summer Olympics in Melbourne. He played 3 games for Japan in 1956.

National team statistics

References

External links
 
 Japan National Football Team Database

1930 births
Possibly living people
Keio University alumni
Association football people from Kanagawa Prefecture
Japanese footballers
Japan international footballers
Olympic footballers of Japan
Footballers at the 1956 Summer Olympics
Association football forwards